

Definition
Tourné, Tournier, Torner, Torné are names that refer to the trade of turning (Latin tornator), but could also be designated to the guardian of a tower, a jailer (old French Tornier). Le Turnier is a name that could be met in the Morbihan. Tournier seems to be a variant of the job of a turning.

Tournier is a surname, and may refer to;

 Henri Tournier (1834–1904), Swiss entomologist
 Lionel Tournier, French curler
 Marcel Tournier (1879–1951), French harpist, composer, and pedagogue
 Mark Tournier (born 1971), Australian cricketer
 Michel Tournier (1924–2016), French writer
 Mike Tournier (born 1963), English electronic musician
 Nicolas Tournier (1590–1639), French Baroque painter
 Paul Tournier (1898–1986), Swiss physician and author
 Walter Tournier (born 1944), Uruguayan director

Surnames of French origin